Lord Hawke was launched at Ostend in 1793, almost certainly under a different name. In 1798 she became a British privateer. The French captured her in 1799 and she became the French privateer Revanche. The British Royal Navy recaptured her in 1800. New owners returned her to her original British name. She disappeared in early 1801, presumed to have foundered with all hands.

British privateer
Lord Hawke first appeared in Lloyd's Register (LR) in 1799. Captain Pendock Neale acquired a letter of marque on 20 July 1798, and Lord Hawke began sailing out of Dartmouth as a privateer.

On 24 August 1798 Mary and Elizabeth, Diamond, master, came into Plymouth. Lord Hawke had recaptured Mary and Elizabeth on 16 August. Her cargo included 22 casks (about two tons), of cochineal.

Argo, Smith, master, also arrived at Plymouth on 24 August. Lord Hawke had detained Argo as Argo was sailing from Nantes to New York. Another report had Argo as a Prussian brig from Embden, and carrying brandy from Bordeaux to Bremen. A third report had the Prussian brig Argo, Albert Smith, master, carrying brandy, glass, iron, and cloth from Nantes to New York. Prize money for Argo was paid in December 1802.

On 11 September the Spanish packet Edad Denon came into Plymouth. She had been returning to Spain from Veracruz when Lord Hawke had captured her. She was bound for Corunna and the British captured her six miles from the Corunna light house. The actual captor was Lord Hawke, which used her sweeps to come up first and take L'Edad de Oro. Nymphe escorted Edad Dono into Plymouth and a naval officer carried the dispatches to the Admiralty in London. Edad Dono, Manuel Cexxo, master, had been carrying mails from Havana. The Spanish threw them overboard, but a sailor from Lord Hawke jumped from her bow and retrieved them before they sank. Edad Dono, of about 200 tons (bm), was believed to be worth £25,000.

The capture of Edad de Oro resulted in Lord Hawke having no problem raising a crew for her next cruise. It also resulted in litigation with Neale and Lord Hawkes owner, and crew contending that Nymphe and Aurora were effectively not in sight at the time of the capture and so not entitled to share in the proceeds. They contended that the capture took place on a clear day and that all that was visible from Lord Hawkes deck was the top reefs of the topsails of the two navy ships. Nymphe was 16 miles west and to windward at the time of the capture, and Aurora 16 miles to leeward.

By end-September, Lord Hawke had made nine captures and had destroyed a French privateer by driving the privateer ashore at Corunna. The prizes consisted of Edad Dono, four Spanish brigs carrying wheat, sugar, and coffee, two Spanish chasse marées, a Prussian vessel carrying brandy, and a vessel carrying 22 casks of cochineal. The privateer Lord Hawke had destroyed had 22 oars, six brass swivel guns, and 42 men.

On 11 October a French privateer cutter of two guns and 40 men came into Plymouth. The privateer was a prize to Lord Hawke. By another account, the privateer was the brig Valeur, of eight guns and 48 men. A third account gave the French privateer's name as Valour (or Vailleur), and stated that she was the former smuggler Vertumnus, of Fowey, which had been captured while coming from Guernsey. Valour had thrown her guns overboard during the chase. She was 10 days out of Brest, and had made no captures. Lord Hawke put Valours French crew ashore in Spain before bringing her into Plymouth. Valours captain was William Cowell, an American, as were two of her lieutenants.

A few days earlier, Lord Hawke had repelled an attack by a privateer brig of 16 guns off St Andero. After a two-hour engagement the French privateer had sailed away. Lord Hawke had had four men wounded and her sails and rigging were damaged. Another account reported that the enemy privateer had been armed with eighteen 12-pounder guns. Lord Hawke would have captured the brig but for a fire that broke out in Lord Hawkes magazine. The confusion that had resulted in the efforts to prevent Lord Hawke from blowing up gave the enemy the opportunity to escape. A third report had some of Lord Hawkes crew jumping overboard; fortunately there were no deaths. By this report, the only casualty was Lord Hawkes doctor, who was wounded, and who returned to Plymouth aboard Vailleur. Lord Hawke then sailed towards the Mediterranean. However, the crew objected and Lord Hawke returned to England, arriving at first at Mevagissey.

On 17 October Engelen (or Eugelon), Johnson, master came into Plymouth. She had been sailing from Barcelona to Altona when Lord Hawke had detained her. The Danish brig Engelen, Osten Johansen, master, had been carrying brandy and wind. She had been intercepted near Corunna.

In early December Lord Hawke brought into Plymouth John, of Poole. John had been sailing from Newfoundland with a cargo of oil and fish when a French privateer of 14 guns captured her. Lord Hawke recaptured John on 30 November. John arrived at Plymouth on 3 December.

On 17 December Handehesteka (or Kamschatka) came into Plymouth. Lord Hawke had captured Handehesteka as she was sailing from Hambro to Tranquebar. Lord Hawke convoyed her prize as far as Scilly before leaving her and returning to cruising.

Lloyd's List reported in May 1799 that a French privateer of 18 guns and 80 men had captured Lord Hawke, Neale master. Her captors sent Lord Hawke into Passages. The French privateer was Victoire, of eighteen 12-pounder guns and 150 men (plus 40 soldiers). Lord Hawke had captured a Spanish brig and to give the prize time to get away, Neale engaged Victoire. After 45 minutes Neale struck. Lord Hawke had had one man killed and five dangerously wounded. Victoire took Lord Hawke and her prize into Bayonne.

French privateer
French sources show Revanche as a 70-ton privateer schooner commissioned in Bayonne in 1800. She was armed with 14 gun and had a crew of three to 10 officers and 24 to 70 men, all under the command of Captain J. Hiriart. She had been equipped at Bayonne by M.Pêche.

On 28 July 1800, HMS Uranie captured the French privateer schooner Revanche. The capture of Revanche took place off Cape Ortegal. Another account states that she had taken four prizes, two English and two Portuguese vessels. Revanche came into Plymouth on 5 August.

Revanche was auctioned on 12 September 1800 at Plymouth.

British letter of marque
Captain Thomas Geary acquired a letter of marque on 10 February 1801.

Fate
In October 1801 Lloyd's List reported that the "Armed schooner" Lord Hawke had sailed from Waterford on 13 April, bound for the West Indies. She had not been heard of since.

Notes

Citations

References
 
 
 
 

1793 ships
Privateer ships of Great Britain
Privateer ships of France
Captured ships
Maritime incidents in 1801
Missing ships
Ships lost with all hands